Stan Kenton Plays for Today is an album by bandleader Stan Kenton recorded in 1966 by Capitol Records.

Track listing
 "It Was A Very Good Year" (Ervin Drake) - 2:17
 "Yesterday" (John Lennon, Paul McCartney) - 2:05
 "Sabre Dance" (Aram Katchaturian) - 4:14
 "Spanish Eyes" (Bert Kaempfert, Charles Singleton, Eddie Snyder) - 2:27
 "Cumana" (Barclay Allen, Harold Spina, Roc Hillman) - 3:20
 "The Sound of Music" (Richard Rodgers, Oscar Hammerstein II) - 2:57
 "Somewhere, My Love (Lara's Theme)" (Maurice Jarre) - 2:18
 "Never on Sunday" (Manos Hadjidakis) - 3:36
 "Michelle" (Lennon, McCartney) - 2:38
 "Strangers in the Night" (Kaempfert, Singleton. Snyder) - 2:47
 "Anna" (Roman Vatro) - 3:30
Recorded at Capitol Studios in Hollywood, CA on October 27, 1966 (tracks 3 & 7), November 8, 1966 (tracks 8 & 10), December 14, 1966 (tracks 1, 2, 4 & 9) and December 19, 1966 (tracks 5, 6 & 11).

Personnel
Stan Kenton - piano, conductor, arranger
Gary Barone, Bud Brisbois, Ronnie Ossa, Dalton Smith, Jimmy Salko (tracks 1, 2 4-6 & 8-11), Ray Triscari (tracks 3 & 7) - trumpet
Monty Budwig (tracks 1, 2, 4-6, 9 & 11), John Worster (tracks 3, 7, 8 & 10) - bass  
Frank DeVito (tracks 3, 7, 8 & 10),  Ray Price (tracks 1, 2, 4-6, 9 & 11) - drums
Larry Bunker (tracks 8 & 10), Frank Carlson, Emil Richards (tracks 1-7, 9 & 11), Adolpho "Chino" Valdez - percussion

References

Stan Kenton albums
1967 albums
Capitol Records albums
Albums conducted by Stan Kenton

Albums recorded at Capitol Studios
Albums produced by Lee Gillette